"Stand Tall" is the title of the debut single by Bahjat, taken from his eponymous debut EP, due for release in the spring of 2016. The song is talks about appreciating the people one has in their life, and has a strong message of unity. With the song, a campaign on social media, dealing with discrimination, also took place under the same title of the song, with a video of different people talking about their experiences with discrimination leading the campaign. The song has so far peaked at #7 on the Maltese Top 10.

Music video
The song's music video was released on December 11, 2015, and it featured 100 people from different countries, singing and dancing along to the song, again sending a strong message of unity and celebrating differences. The video propelled the song to debut at #8 on the Bay Malta's Top 10.

Chart performance

References

External links
  Full lyrics of this song

2015 singles
2015 songs